The Byron Bay Red Devils are an Australian rugby league football team based in Byron Bay, New South Wales they played in the Northern Rivers Regional Rugby League.

References

External links

Rugby league teams in New South Wales
1974 establishments in Australia
Rugby clubs established in 1974
Byron Bay, New South Wales